Lieberman in Love is a 1995 American short film directed by Christine Lahti. It won an Oscar in 1996 for Best Live Action Short Subject.

A short story by W. P. Kinsella, "Lieberman in Love", was the basis for the film. The Oscar win came as a surprise to Kinsella, who, watching the award telecast from home, had no idea the film had been made and released. He was not listed in the film's credits or acknowledged by Lahti in her acceptance speech. A full-page advertisement ran in Variety apologizing to Kinsella for the error.

Plot
At a resort in Hawaii, wealthy Joe Lieberman is attracted to a guest named Shaleen, who turns out to be a prostitute. They begin a professional relationship, which continues even after Joe develops a romantic interest in a married woman, Kate, who sells him a condominium.

Cast
 Danny Aiello as Joe Lieberman
 Christine Lahti as Shaleen
 Nancy Travis as Kate
 Allan Arbus as Elderly Man
 Lisa Banes as Woman
 Beth Grant as Linda Baker
 David Rasche as M.C. at Luau

Home media 
This film has been released in Australia as one of four shorts (Witness, Duke of Groove, Lieberman in Love, Session Man), on a budget DVD.

See also 
1995 in film
Field of Dreams

References

External links

1995 films
1995 short films
American independent films
American short films
Films based on works by W. P. Kinsella
Films directed by Christine Lahti
Films set in Hawaii
Films shot in Hawaii
Live Action Short Film Academy Award winners
1990s English-language films
1990s American films